Loleta may refer to:

Loleta, California
Loleta, Pennsylvania